Golden mean may refer to:
Golden mean (philosophy), the felicitous middle between the extremes of excess and deficiency
Golden mean (Judaism), a philosophy pertaining to body and soul in Jewish belief
Golden ratio, a specific mathematical ratio (sometimes called golden mean)
Golden ratio (mathematics and visual art)
The Golden Mean (1993), third novel in The Griffin and Sabine Trilogy by Nick Bantock
The golden-mean fallacy, another name for the argument to moderation
Doctrine of the Golden Mean, a chapter in Li Ji, one of the Four Books of Confucianism

See also
 Ethic of reciprocity, also known as the Golden Rule